This is a list of Tamil language films produced in the Tamil cinema industry of India that have been released in 2023.

Box office collection 
The highest-grossing Tamil films released in 2023, by worldwide box office gross revenue, are as follows:

January – March

Notes

References

External links 

Tamil
2023
Tamil